Donald O'Neal Aldridge (born July 22, 1932) is a retired lieutenant general in the United States Air Force.

Biography
Aldridge was born in Solo, Missouri, in 1932. He graduated from the University of Nebraska-Lincoln and Creighton University.

Career
Aldridge originally enlisted in the Air Force in 1951. He then began training to become a Russian linguist. In 1958, he was commissioned as an officer.

He began flight training at Moore Air Base and Greenville Air Force Base. Afterwards, he flew Boeing B-47 Stratojets with the 44th Bombardment Wing at Chennault Air Force Base.

Aldridge later became a Boeing B-52 Stratofortress pilot with the 17th Bombardment Wing at Wright-Patterson Air Force Base. During this time, he also completed Squadron Officer School. Afterwards, he was assigned to the 93d Bombardment Wing at Castle Air Force Base as an instructor pilot. In 1968, Aldridge was deployed to serve in the Vietnam War, stationed at Kadena Air Base. The following year, he returned to Castle Air Force Base.

In 1972, Aldridge graduated from the Air Command and Staff College and was assigned to the 43d Strategic Wing at Andersen Air Force Base. Later that year, he took part in Operation Linebacker II. In 1973, he became executive officer of the 43d Strategic Wing and the 72d Bombardment Wing.

After being stationed at Offutt Air Force Base, Aldridge graduated from the National War College in 1977. He was then assigned to the Office of the Deputy Chief of Staff, Plans and Operations of the Air Force. From 1979 to 1980, he was assigned to the Office of the Joint Chiefs of Staff. Aldridge later transferred to the Defense Mapping Agency, eventually become the agency's deputy director.

In 1981, Aldridge became the U.S. representative to the Military Committee at the headquarters of NATO. Afterwards, he served as a representative of the Joint Chiefs of Staff on multiple occasions. In 1986, he assumed command of the 1st Strategic Aerospace Division at Vandenberg Air Force Base. Aldridge became Vice Commander in Chief of Strategic Air Command in 1988 before retiring 1991.

Awards he received during his career include the Air Force Distinguished Service Medal, the Defense Superior Service Medal with three oak leaf clusters, the Legion of Merit, the Bronze Star Medal, the Meritorious Service Medal, the Air Medal with oak leaf cluster, the Joint Service Commendation Medal, the Air Force Commendation Medal with oak leaf cluster and the Army Commendation Medal.

References

1932 births
Living people
People from Texas County, Missouri
United States Air Force generals
United States Air Force personnel of the Vietnam War
Recipients of the Air Force Distinguished Service Medal
Recipients of the Defense Superior Service Medal
Recipients of the Legion of Merit
Recipients of the Air Medal
University of Nebraska–Lincoln alumni
Creighton University alumni
Air Command and Staff College alumni
National War College alumni
Linguists from the United States